The Kissing Bandit may refer to:

Arts and entertainment
The Kissing Bandit (film), a 1948 film starring Frank Sinatra and Kathryn Grayson
Jojo the Kissing Bandit, a character in the Avatar: The Last Airbender trading card game
An episode of The Love Boat

People
Adriano Belli (born 1977), defensive tackle in the Canadian Football League nicknamed "The Kissing Bandit" for his penchant for kissing people on the cheek
Richard Dawson (1932–2012), actor and game show host nicknamed "The Kissing Bandit" for kissing female contestants while hosting Family Feud
Morganna (born 1947), buxom entertainer nicknamed "The Kissing Bandit" for running onto baseball fields and kissing select baseball players throughout the 1970s and 1980s
Edna Murray (1898–1966), criminal who got the nickname "Kissing Bandit" after kissing her victim during a robbery
Valentine Phantom, nicknamed "The Kissing Bandit" for decorating the business district of Boulder, Colorado, United States, with red hearts on Valentine's Day